Pura Purani T'uxu or Pura Purani Tuqu (Aymara pura pura Xenophyllum (or a species of it), -ni a suffix to indicate ownership, "the one with the pura pura plant", t'uxu window or tuqu goitre, also spelled Purapurani Thojo) is a  mountain in the Cordillera Real in the Andes of Bolivia. It is located in the La Paz Department, Los Andes Province, Pucarani Municipality. It lies northeast of Nasa Q'ara and north of a lake named Allqa Quta. The small lake northwest of the mountain is Khunu Quta ("snow lake").

References 

Mountains of La Paz Department (Bolivia)